Leanna may refer to:

People 
 Leanna Brodie, Canadian actress and playwright
 Leanna Carriere-Wellwood, Canadian pole vaulter and heptathlete
 Leanna Crawford, American singer-songwriter
 Leanna Creel, American actress

Fictional characters 
 Leanna Cavanagh, ITV soap opera Emmerdale
 Leanna Love, CBS soap opera, The Young and the Restless

Places 
 Leanna, Kansas
 San Leanna, Texas